Miguel Ángel Prendes Pérez (born 28 June 2001), commonly known as Mangel, is a Spanish footballer who plays as a midfielder for Real Oviedo Vetusta.

Club career
Born in Carreño, Asturias, Mangel began his career with CD Roces before joining Deportivo de La Coruña's youth setup in July 2018. He made his senior debut with the latter's reserves on 5 January 2020, coming on as a late substitute in a 0–0 Tercera División away draw against Arosa SC.

On 1 July 2020, after finishing his formation, Mangel was definitely promoted to Dépors B-team. On 1 August of the following year, after featuring rarely, he moved to Real Oviedo and was assigned to the B-side in Tercera División RFEF.

Mangel made his first team debut on 10 January 2022, replacing Marco Sangalli in a 1–1 home draw against SD Eibar in the Segunda División. On 26 January of the following year, he renewed his contract with the Carbayones until 2026.

References

External links

2001 births
Living people
People from Gijón (Asturian comarca)
Spanish footballers
Footballers from Asturias
Association football midfielders
Segunda División players
Segunda Federación players
Tercera División players
Tercera Federación players
Deportivo Fabril players
Real Oviedo Vetusta players
Real Oviedo players